I'm Ready is the second studio album by singer Tevin Campbell, released on October 26, 1993. With this album, Campbell showed his skill as a soul singer. I'm Ready was nominated for a Grammy Award in the Best R&B Album category.

Reception 

The album sold over 2 million copies, reaching double Platinum status, and yielded the biggest R&B hit of his career, the #1 R&B single "Can We Talk". The album produced 3 more charting singles with "I'm Ready", "Always In My Heart" and "Don't Say Goodbye Girl". To date this has been Tevin's biggest selling album and many considered this album to be the high mark of his career despite the fact he was only 16 when he recorded the album. The album was nominated for 3 Grammy Awards: 1994 Best Rhythm & Blues Vocal Performance – Male ("Can We Talk"), 1995 Best Rhythm & Blues Vocal Performance – Male ("I'm Ready"), and Best Rhythm & Blues Album. Prince was credited as Paisley Park for his contributions to the album as a songwriter, arranger, and producer.

Track listing 

Notes
  denotes an associate producer
  denotes an additional producer

Personnel 
Credits adapted from album's liner notes.

 Eric Anest – engineer 
 Michael B. – drums 
 Babyface –  producer, instruments, and background vocals 
 Tommy Barbarella – keyboards 
 Louis Biancaniello – associate producer, keyboards, programming, and synthesizer arrangements 
 Vernon "Ice" Black – acoustic guitar 
 Atlanta Bliss – horns 
 Nicole Bradin – background vocals 
 Michael Brauer – mixing 
 Tevin Campbell –  lead vocals , background vocals 
 Milton Chan – assistant engineer 
 Bruck Dawit – assistant mix engineer 
 David Eike – assistant engineer 
 David "Frazeman" Frazer – mixing and vocal engineer 
 Lori Fumar – assistant engineer 
 Tom Garneau – engineer 
 Nikita Germaine – background vocals 
 Brad Gilderman – engineer 
 Preston Glass – sitar , background vocals 
 William "DJ" Graves – scratches 
 Sandy Griffith – background vocals 
 Ray Hahnfeldt – engineer , additional engineering 
 Jerry Hey – conductor and string arrangements 
 Charlie Hunter – electric guitar 
 Skyler Jett – background vocals 
 Kathleen Johnson – background vocals 
 Kirk Johnson – additional production , percussion 
 Quincy Jones – executive producer
 Ellen Keating – background vocals 
 Janice Lee – production coordinator 
 Eric Leeds – horns and horn arrangements 
 Tony Lindsay – background vocals 
 Mike Mani – associate producer, keyboards, and programming 
 Frank "Killer Bee" Martin – synthesized strings 
 Leslie Matthews – background vocals 
 Benny Medina – executive producer
 Steve Noonan – engineer 
 Barney Perkins – mixing 
 Prince –  producer, arranger, and executive producer 
 Marc "Elvis" Reyburn – engineer 
 Claytoven Richardson – background vocals 
 Rail Rogut – assistant engineer , strings engineer 
 Matt Rohr – assistant engineer 
 Marc Russo – soprano saxophone 
 Levi Seacer Jr. – guitar 
 Monty Seward – associate producer, keyboards, and programming 
 Cynthia Shiloh – production coordinator 
 Daryl Simmons –  producer 
 Ivy Skoff – production coordinator 
 Donnell Sullivan – engineer 
 Sonny T. – bass 
 Jeanie Tracy – background vocals 
 Kevin Walden – production coordinator 
 Narada Michael Walden – producer and arranger , rhythm and vocal arrangements , piano 
 Randy Walker – MIDI technician 
 Steve Warner – assistant engineer 
 Dave Way – mixing 
 Ulrich Wild – assistant engineer 
 Jim "Z" Zumpano – engineer

Charts

Weekly charts

Year-end charts

Certifications

References

External links 
 Tevin Campbell-I'm Ready at Discogs

1993 albums
Tevin Campbell albums
Qwest Records albums
Warner Records albums
Albums produced by Prince (musician)
Albums produced by Babyface (musician)
Albums produced by Narada Michael Walden